Anton Anatolyevich Zhukov (born 8 July 1982) is a former Russian professional football player.

Club career
He made his Russian Football National League debut for FC Dynamo Saint Petersburg on 27 May 2003 in a game against FC Lada Tolyatti. He played 5 seasons in the FNL for 5 clubs.

External links
 
 

1982 births
Living people
People from Tikhvin
Russian footballers
Association football defenders
FC Dynamo Saint Petersburg players
FC Luch Vladivostok players
FC Anzhi Makhachkala players
FC Ural Yekaterinburg players
FC Mordovia Saransk players
FC Metallurg Lipetsk players
Sportspeople from Leningrad Oblast